Gol Bodagh (also Romanized as Gol Bodāgh) is a village in Bughda Kandi Rural District, in the Central District of Zanjan County, Zanjan Province, Iran. At the 2006 census, its population was 128, in 26 families.

References 

Populated places in Zanjan County